Neoalosterna is a genus of beetles in the family Cerambycidae, containing the following species:

 Neoalosterna capitata (Newman, 1841)
 Neoalosterna rubida (LeConte, 1873)

References

Lepturinae